The 1st Daily Telegraph Trophy was a motor race, run to Formula One rules, held on 2 October 1954 at Aintree Circuit, Merseyside. The race was run over 17 laps, and was won by British driver Stirling Moss in a Maserati 250F. Moss also set pole and fastest lap. Mike Hawthorn was second in a Vanwall and Harry Schell third in another 250F.

Results

References 

Daily Telegraph
Daily Telegraph